To Live may refer to the following works;

 To Liv(e), 1992 Hong Kong film by Evans Chan
 To Live (novel), written by Yu Hua
 To Live (1994 film), based on the novel and directed by Zhang Yimou
 To Live (1937 film), an Italian film, directed by Guido Brignone
 To Live (2010 film), a Russian film directed by Yuri Bykov
 Ikiru, a Japanese film directed by Akira Kurosawa whose title translates to To Live